The Gyeongnam Provincial Namhae College is South Korea's first provincial university founded by South Gyeongsang Province aimed at fostering specialized talents in the region in March 1996.

It was opened in March 1996, receiving accreditation for the Namhae Junior College in November 1994.
In April 1999, it opened a lifelong education institute. In January 2013, it signed a treaty with China's Shanghai Business School.

There are nine departments, tourism, hotel cooking, shipbuilding, mechatronics, electronics, computer software engineering, business practices, Financial accounting practices, and tourism landscape design.

See also
List of national universities in South Korea
List of universities and colleges in South Korea
Education in Korea

References

External links
 Official website

See also
List of universities and colleges in South Korea

1996 establishments in South Korea
Public universities and colleges in South Korea
Namhae County
Educational institutions established in 1996